Carex polysticha is a tussock-forming species of perennial sedge in the family Cyperaceae. It is native to parts of Central America and South America.

See also
List of Carex species

References

polysticha
Taxa named by Johann Otto Boeckeler
Plants described in 1869
Flora of Argentina
Flora of Brazil
Flora of Bolivia
Flora of Colombia
Flora of Costa Rica
Flora of the Dominican Republic
Flora of Ecuador
Flora of Guatemala
Flora of Jamaica
Flora of Panama
Flora of Paraguay
Flora of Peru
Flora of Uruguay